The National Development Party was the first opposition party in the multi-party system in Turkey, established by Nuri Demirağ in 1945.

Defunct political parties in Turkey
Political parties established in 1945
1945 establishments in Turkey
Political parties disestablished in 1958
1958 disestablishments in Turkey